Charles Ross may refer to:

Military and politics
 Charles Ross (British Army officer, born 1667) (1667–1732), Scottish general and MP
 Charles Ross (Ross-shire MP, born 1721) (1721–1745), Scottish soldier and MP
 Charles Ross (Royal Navy officer) (1776–1849)
 Charles Ross (MP for Northampton) (1799–1860), British Member of Parliament for Orford, St Germans and Northampton
 Charles N. Ross (c. 1842–?), New York State Treasurer
 Charles Campbell Ross (1849–1920), British politician and banker
 Charles Ross (British Army officer, born 1864) (1864–1930), First World War divisional commander
 Sir Charles Lockhart-Ross, 7th Baronet (c. 1763–1814), Scottish landowner, politician, and British Army officer
 Sir Charles Lockhart-Ross, 8th Baronet, son of Sir Charles Lockhart-Ross, 7th Baronet and father of Sir Charles Ross, 9th Baronet
 Sir Charles Ross, 9th Baronet (1872–1942), inventor of the Ross rifle, used by the Canadian army during World War I
 C. Ben Ross (1876–1946), governor of Idaho
 Charles G. Ross (SAAF officer) (1892–?), South African World War I flying ace
 Charlie Ross (Mississippi politician) (born 1956), American politician and attorney
 Charles Ross (Washington politician), politician from the US state of Washington
 Charles Cathmer Ross (1884–1938), provincial politician from Alberta, Canada
 Charles Henderson Ross (1864–1919), Scottish businessman and member of the Legislative Council of Hong Kong

Other people
 Karl Ross (1816–1858), German painter born and sometimes known as Charles.
 Charles Henry Ross (1835–1897), British cartoonist
 Charles J. Ross (1859–1918), Canadian-born American vaudeville entertainer
 Charles Brewster "Charley" Ross (1870–?), American missing person case in the 1870s
 Charles Ross (Australian cricketer) (1863–1935)
 Charles Ross (English cricketer) (1852–1911)
 Charlie Ross (journalist) (1885–1950), American journalist and White House Press Secretary
 Charles Ross (historian) (1924–1986), English historian, biographer of Edward IV and Richard III
 Charles Ross (artist) (born 1937), American sculptor
 Charlie Ross (footballer) (1878–1969), Australian rules footballer
 Charlie Ross (singer), bassist with Eternity's Children, pop and country singer
 Charlie Ross (antiques expert) (born 1946), British antiques expert and auctioneer
 Charles Stanley Ross, American literary scholar, academic, and author
 Charles Ross (born 1934), astronomy benefactor after whom the asteroid 25944 Charlesross is named

Non-personal
 Charles Ross (apple) is an English apple variety

See also
Charles Lockhart-Ross (disambiguation)
 Charlie Rose (disambiguation)